Francis Thomas "Tad" Gormley (December 23, 1883 – December 5, 1965) was an American athletic trainer, coach and official. He was a native of Cambridge, Massachusetts and was the head of the New Orleans Gymnastics Club and Amateur Athletic Union (AAU).  

In 1907, Gormley moved to New Orleans to become the physical director at the Young Men's Gymnastics Club, the predecessor to the New Orleans Athletic Club. Gormley served as head trainer at Tulane, LSU and Loyola New Orleans. He was also a game official in the New Orleans Prep School Athletic League for soccer, football and basketball and superintendent of City Park Stadium.

Coaching career
In 1914, Gormley was hired as the track coach at Tulane University. In 1916, he moved to Baton Rouge, Louisiana and at different times was head coach for the men's basketball, boxing, track and field and wrestling teams at Louisiana State University. He served as head coach of the LSU Tigers basketball team from 1921 to 1923, posting a 25–11 record and head coach of the LSU Tigers track and field team from 1916 to 1927. 

In 1927, Gormley returned to New Orleans and from 1928 to 1930, he was the head basketball coach at Loyola University New Orleans. While at Loyola, he also served as the boxing and track and field coach.

Gormley was an associate coach for the U.S. Olympic track team at the 1932 Summer Olympics.

Accolades
In 1962, he was elected to the National Athletic Trainers' Association Hall of Fame, the Louisiana Sports Hall of Fame in 1968, the Greater New Orleans Sports Hall of Fame in 1971 and the Louisiana Athletic Trainers’ Hall of Fame in 1990. The former City Park Stadium in City Park, New Orleans was renamed Tad Gormley Stadium in his honor in 1957.

Personal life
He was the uncle of Joseph L. Gormley.

References

External links
 

1883 births
1965 deaths
American men's basketball coaches
Basketball coaches from Massachusetts
College men's basketball head coaches in the United States
College track and field coaches in the United States
Loyola Wolf Pack men's basketball coaches
LSU Tigers basketball coaches
LSU Tigers boxing
LSU Tigers and Lady Tigers track and field coaches
LSU Tigers wrestling
Sportspeople from Cambridge, Massachusetts
Tulane Green Wave track and field coaches